Joliet Iron and Steel Company was a steel manufacturer located in Joliet, Illinois. 

The Union Coal, Iron and Transportation Company was founded in 1869. In 1873, it was reorganized into the Joliet Iron and Steel Company. In 1889 the company became part of Illinois Steel Company.

The Joliet Works of Illinois Steel ceased operations in 1932.

References

Steel companies of the United States
Companies based in Will County, Illinois
Defunct manufacturing companies based in Illinois
Economy of Joliet, Illinois
History of Joliet, Illinois
1869 establishments in Illinois
1932 disestablishments in Illinois
Manufacturing companies established in 1869
Manufacturing companies disestablished in 1932
1889 mergers and acquisitions